The 2022–23 Premier League is the 31st season of the Premier League, and the 124th season of top-flight English football overall. 

Manchester City are the two-time defending champions, having won both the 2020–21 and 2021–22 season.

Developments
Starting from the 2022–23 season, clubs are able to make five substitutions rather than three. These substitutions can be made in three stoppages during game time, and additionally at half time, in line with other top European leagues - Serie A, La Liga, Ligue 1 and the Bundesliga. There was a mid-season break for the 2022 FIFA World Cup in Qatar, when the last matches were played on the weekend of 12–13 November 2022, and the first matches after the World Cup were played on 26 December 2022, after the 2022 FIFA World Cup Final on 18 December 2022.

Summary

Postponements
On 9 September 2022, all Premier League matches scheduled for 10–12 September were postponed as a mark of respect due to the death of Queen Elizabeth II. The following week, three Premier League matches scheduled for 17–18 September were postponed due to the policing issues surrounding Queen Elizabeth II's funeral on 19 September. Also, in the same week, the Arsenal game against Manchester City, scheduled for 19 October, was postponed to accommodate Arsenal's Europa League tie with PSV Eindhoven, which was itself postponed from 15 September to 20 October.

Teams
Twenty teams are competing in the league – the top seventeen teams from the previous season and the three teams promoted from the Championship. The promoted teams are Fulham, Bournemouth and Nottingham Forest, who return after an absence of one, two and twenty-three years from the top flight respectively. The twenty-three years between Nottingham Forest's previous Premier League season and this season is the longest absence for a previous Premier League club in the Premier League era to date. They replaced Burnley (relegated after a six-year top flight spell), Watford, and Norwich City (both teams relegated after just one year back in the top flight).

Stadiums and locations

 Note: Table lists in alphabetical order.

Personnel and kits

  Nottingham Forest played without a shirt sponsor until 1 January 2023, when the club announced UNHCR as their shirt sponsor for the remainder of the season.

Managerial changes

League table

Results 
The fixtures were released on 16 June 2022.

Season statistics

Top scorers

Hat-tricks

Top assists

Clean sheets

Discipline

Player
 Most yellow cards: 10
 Joelinton (Newcastle United)
 João Palhinha (Fulham)

 Most red cards: 2
 Casemiro (Manchester United)

Club
 Most yellow cards: 64
Crystal Palace
Everton
Fulham

 Fewest yellow cards: 33
Brighton & Hove Albion
Manchester City
West Ham United
 Most red cards: 6
Wolverhampton Wanderers

 Fewest red cards: 0
 7 clubs

Awards

Monthly awards

Notes

References

 
Premier League seasons
1
England
England